This is a list of fellows of Imperial College London by year elected.

Fellows by year

2012
 Lord Kerr of Kinlochard
 Martin Knight
 David Lloyd-Smith

2011
 Sir Peter Gershon
 Alan Howard

2010
 Ram Gidoomal
 Lim Chuan Poh
 Lady Wolfson of Marylebone

2009
 Sir Leszek Borysiewicz
 Dame Julia Higgins
 Tom Kibble
 Tony Mitcheson
 Rees Rawlings

2008
 Anthony G. Evans
 David Phillips

2007
 Trevor Phillips
 Ratan Tata
 Edmund Daukoru

2006
 Sir Brian Bender
 Sir John Lawton
 Frank Leppington
 Sir Christopher O'Donnell
 Mark Walport
 Victor Wynn

2005
 Amit Chatterjee
 Susan E. Ion
 Melvyn Myers
 Sir Colin Terry

2004
 Bertil Andersson
 Sir Alec Broers
 John Burland
 Sir Alan Fersht
 Keith Miller
 Robert Williamson

2003
 Lord Oxburgh
 Sir John Pattison
 Sir Gordon Conway
 Sir Colin Dollery
 Christopher Edwards
 William Wakeham

2002
 Magda Czigany
 Philip Ruffles
 Gary Tanaka
 Lee Kuan Yew

2001
 Wilfred Corrigan
 Sir Peter J. Lachmann
 John H.D. Prescott

2000
 Brigitte A. Askonas
 Steven V. Ley
 David Q. Mayne

1999
 Eric H. Brown
 Sir Robert J. Margetts
 Peter E. Mee
 Klaus F. Roth

1998
 John S. Archer
 Nay Htun
 Stuart A. Lipton
 David E. Potter
 Sir Evelyn de Rothschild
 J. Trevor Stuart

1997
 Patrick J. Dowling
 Brian E.F. Fender
 Sir Robert May
 Joe Y. Pillay
 Sankar K. Sen

1996
 Bruce McA. Sayers
 Dame Margaret Turner-Warwick
 Lord Vincent of Coleshill
 Sir Peter Williams
 Lewis Wolpert

1995
 Sir Eric Ash
 Hon-Kwan Cheng
 John P. MacArthur
 A.K. Oppenheim
 Kenneth E. Weale

1994
 Sir David Cox
 Sir Ralph Robins
 Roger W. H. Sargent
 Elsie M. Widdowson
 Abdus Salam

1993
 Syamal Gupta
 The Hon. Sara Morrison
 Olgierd C. Zienkiewicz
 Sir Geoffrey Wilkinson
 Sir Alfred Lane Beit

1992
 Sir Roger Bannister
 Sir John Cadogan
 Alexander King
 John H. Smith

1991
 Sir Alan Cottrell
 Peter A. Cox
 The Lord Wolfson of Marylebone
 Sir Edward Dunlop
 Ralph Alexander Raphael

1990
 John F. Levy
 Sir James Lighthill
 Sir Frank Hartley
 Eric R. Laithwaite

1989
 Walter K. Hayman
 Sir Norman Payne
 Sir David Weatherall
 Joseph Kestin
 (Ian) Robert Maxwell

1988
 Ian Butterworth
 The Rt. Hon. Sir Frank Cooper
 Sir Peter Hirsch
 Sir Stanley Peart
 Mostafa K. Tolba
 Soichiro Honda

1987
 William C. Brown
 The Hon. Rilwanu Lukman
 Lord Porter
 David D. Raphael
 Leonard Rotherham

1986
 Sir Geoffrey Allen
 Bernard G. Neal
 Baroness Warnock
 Sir Toby Weaver
 Dorothy E.C. Wedderburn

1985
 John H. Argyris
 Lord Carr
 Sir John Egan
 H. Morton Neal
 Sir Randolph Quirk
 John Sutton

1984
 Sir Clive Sinclair
 Sir Alec W. Skempton
 Sir Richard Southwood
 Heinrich P.K. Ursprung
 Sumant Moolgaokar

1983
 Anthony R. Barringer
 Sir Peter Baxendell
 Sir Hugh Ford
 William R.S. Garton
 Sir William Hawthorne

1982
 The Hon. Shou Lum Chen
 Marc Julia
 John Stodart Kennedy
 Marston Grieg Fleming

1981
 Sir Alan Muir Wood
 Alfred Rene John Paul Ubbelohde
 Sir David Huddie
 Sir Sydney Martin

1980
 Alfred G. Gaydon
 Sir Andrew Huxley
 Reimar Lüst
 John P. Sowden
 Sir Derek Barton

1979
 Jean-Jacques Baron
 Peter W. Foster
 Percy Cyril Claude Garnham
 Michael John Davies
 Sir Monty Finniston

1978
 Sven Olving
 Sir Angus Paton
 Sir Ernst Boris Chain
 Sir Laurence Kirwan
 Sir Nevill Mott

1977
 The Rt Hon. Lord Armstrong of Sanderstead
 Jack Wheeler Barrett
 Eric Francis Cutcliffe
 B.G. Levich
 James Dwyer McGee
 Sir Vincent Wigglesworth

1976
 Kenneth G. Denbigh
 Sir Kingsley Dunham
 Heinz Maier-Leibnitz
 Sir David Woodbine-Parish
 The Rt Hon. Lord Kearton of Whitchurch

1975
 The Lord Scarman
 Dame Margaret Weston
 Alfred Spinks
 Harry Jones
 The Rt Hon. Lord Rothschild

1974
 Sir Ralf Dahrendorf
 The Hon. Sir Henry Fisher
 Sir John Mason
 Bernard Paul Gregory
 Sir Douglas Logan
 Sir Alistair Pilkington

1973
 Oscar V.S. Heath
 Robert W. Sarnoff
 William D. Scott
 Geoffrey Morse Binnie
 Sir Robert Lang Lickley

1972
 Douglas William Holder
 Sir Alan Hodgkin
 Sir Edward Playfair
 Alan Woodworth Johnson
 The Lord Flowers

1971
 Brigadier Ralph Alger Bagnold 
 Miss Letitia Chitty
 Nicholas Kemmer 
 Sir David Nicolson
 Bernard Boxall

1970
 R.N. Dogra
 Dennis Gabor
 Rudolph Glossop
 Sir Owen Saunders
 Sir Andrew Akiba Shonfield

1969
 His Excellency Mr Andre Clasen
 William Owen James
 The Lord Nelson of Stafford
 Owain Westmacott Richards
 Arthur Robert Owen Williams

1968
 Donald H. Hey
 Stephen W.K. Morgan
 Geoffrey Emett Blackman
 Sir Harold Harding
 Sir Denning Pearson
 David Williams

1967
 Sir Ewart Jones
 The Lord Blackett of Chelsea
 Sir Charles Goodeve
 Sir William McCrea
 George Hoole Mitchell
 James Newby

1966
 Sir Derman Christopherson
 Edwin S. Hills
 James Cecil Mitcheson
 Helen Kemp Porter
 Sir Hubert Shirley-Smith
 Arnold Tustin

1965
 Sir Charles Cawley
 Austen Harry Albu
 Sir Andrew Bryan
 Reginald John Halsey
 Sir Gilbert Roberts

1964
 Sir Hugh Tett
 John Stuart Anderson
 The Rt Hon. Lord Beeching
 Sir Charles Lillicrap
 George Sail Campbell Lucas
 Walter Frederick Whittard

1963
 Harry Julius Emeleus
 Sir Arnold Hall
 William Hume-Rothery
 Sir Terence Morrison-Scott
 Dudley Maurice Newitt
 The Rt Hon. Lord Sherfield
 Constance Fligg Tipper

1962
 Arthur Alfred Eldridge
 George Ingle Finch
 Sir Stanley George Hooker
 Sir Owen Jones
 Reginald Leslie Smith-Rose
 Sir James Stubblefield

1961
 Oliver Meredith Boone Bulman
 Albert Charles Chibnall
 Thomas Graeme Nelson Haldane
 Donald Thomas Alfred Townend
 Joseph Herbert Watson

1960
 Cecil William Dannatt
 Frederick Gugenheim Gregory
 The Lord King Norton of Wotton Underwood
 Geoffrey Charles Lowry
 Sir William Pugh

1959
 Sir Lewis Casson
 Sir Graham Cunningham
 Arthur Holmes
 Sir Christopher (Kelk) Ingold
 Ronald McKinnon-Wood
 Leonard Bessemer Pfeil

1958
 Henry Vincent Aird Briscoe
 Charles Alfred Bristow
 The Hon. Hugh Fletcher-Moulton
 Vincent Charles Illing
 Alfred John Sutton Pippard
 Stanley Livingstone Smith

1957
 Sir Harold Bishop
 Edward Hindle
 Hyman Levy
 Philip Rabone
 Herbert Harold Read
 Albert Percival Rowe
 Charles Egbart Reynolds Sams

1956
 William Brown
 Sydney Chapman
 David Garnett
 The Lord Jackson of Burnley
 James Watson Munro
 The Lord Penney of East Hendred
 William Francis Gray Swann

1955
 The Lord Ashby of Brandon
 Laurence Carr Hill
 John Anthony Sydney Ritson
 Sir George Paget Thomson

1954
 Sir David Brunt
 Henry Francis Cronin
 Sir Alfred Egerton
 Arthur Montague Holbein
 William Alfred Cyril Newman

1953
 Francis Howard Carr
 Arthur Clifford Hartley
 William Richard Jones
 William Nowell
 Marmaduke Tudsbery Tudsbery
 Sir Bruce Gordon White

1952
 Sir Leonard Bairstow
 Raymond George Hubert Clements
 Sir John Theodore Hewitt
 Robert Salmon Hutton

1951
 Robert Annan
 Gordon Maskew Fair
 Sir Frederick Handley-Page
 Sir Ian Heilbron
 Edward Duffield McDermott
 Stanley Robson

1950
 Sir George Dyson
 Jeremy Clarke Hunsaker
 Sir Richard Southwell
 Sir Henry Steward

1949
 Karl Taylor Compton
 Harold Johann Thomas Ellingham
 Sir Henry McMahon
 Thomas Arthur Rickard
 William Selkirk

1948
 Alfred Jefferson Brett
 Rev. James Owen Hannay
 John Johnson
 Edward Frank Dalby Witchell

1947
 Warren Royal Dawson
 Sir Arthur Hall
 Sir James Pringle

1946
 Vernon Herbert Blackman
 Alexander Gow
 Walter T. Prideaux
 Sir Evelyn Shaw
 Sir John Edward Thornycroft
 Sir Gilbert Walker
 Martha Annie Whiteley

1945
 Charles Samuel Garland
 Percy Good
 Sir Andrew McCance
 The Lord Rayleigh
 Sir Pierre van Ryneveld
 Samuel John Truscott
 William Whitehead Watts
 Alfred North Whitehead
 Harry Egerton Wimperis

1944
 The Lord Falmouth
 William Palmer Wynne

1943
 Herbert George Wells
 Frank Twyman
 Frederick Charles Lea
 James Gunson Lawn
 Frederick William Lanchester

1942
 Sir Henry (Thomas) Tizard

1941
 Sydney William Smith

1939
 Edward Frankland Armstrong
 Oscar Faber
 Thomas Turner

1937
 Charles Vickery Drysdale
 Sir Albert Howard
 Edward Thomas McCarthy
 Sir Frank Smith

1935
 Alfred Fowler

1934

 William Eccles
 Conwy Lloyd Morgan
 William Johnson Sollas

1933
 Percy Faraday Frankland
 Henry Louis
 Sir Basil Mott
 Alfred Edwin Howard Tutton

1932
 Sir Charles Boys
 William Frecheville
 Sir Ralph Freeman
 Sir Thomas Holland
 Herbert Alfred Humphrey
 Richard Dixon Oldham
 Sir William (Jackson) Pope
 James Whitehead
 Sir Herbert Wright

See also 
 President and Rector of Imperial College London
 List of Nobel laureates affiliated with Imperial College London

References

Imperial College London